The following is a list of all team-to-team transactions that have occurred in the National Hockey League (NHL) during the 1959–60 NHL season. It lists which team each player has been traded to and for which player(s) or other consideration(s), if applicable.

Transactions 

Notes
 Trade voided on February 7, 1960, after Kelly and McNeill refused to report to the Rangers.

References

Transactions
National Hockey League transactions